William Parker Hudson (February 13, 1841 – November 21, 1912) was an Ontario businessman and political figure. He represented Hastings East in the Legislative Assembly of Ontario from 1883 to 1894 as a Conservative member.

He was born in Thurlow Township, Hastings County, Upper Canada in 1841, the son of Charles Hudson, a blacksmith. Hudson apprenticed with his father and went on to manufacture carriages. In 1866, he married Jane Fargay, the daughter of a local farmer. He served as treasurer and deputy reeve for the township. He died in 1912.

References

External links 

1841 births
1912 deaths
Progressive Conservative Party of Ontario MPPs